This is a list of highest-grossing Bengali-language films. This list covers the Bengali cinema in West Bengal (Kolkata).

Tollywood film industry
The Indian Bengali film industry is centered in the Tollygunge neighborhood of the city of Kolkata, West Bengal, and has been known by the nickname Tollywood, a portmanteau of the words Tollygunge and Hollywood, since 1932. West Bengal was the center of Indian cinema in the 1930s, with Bengali cinema accounting for a quarter of India's film output in the 1950s. A 2014 industry report stated that while there were about 100 films created in Bengali every year, no more than ten percent were breaking even financially.

Highest-grossing films

*Top 10 Bengali Film's (West Bengal, Kolkata).

Highest opening weeks

Highest-grossing franchises and film series

Highest-grossing films by year
 
Note:- This list is only for the theatrical collection of the movies(not overall collections like OTT, Satelight rights , music rights and don't include worldwide collection at all). Please didn't change (2000-2022) this film names ,rather add the films of 2023 and onwards.

See also
List of Bengali films
National Film Award for Best Feature Film in Bengali
Bangladesh National Film Award for Best Film
List of Bangladeshi submissions for the Academy Award for Best Foreign Language Film
Hyderabad Bengali Film Festival
Kolkata International Film Festival
Dhaka International Film Festival

References

External links
 IMDb: The 100 Greatest Bengali Movies Of All Time

Cinema of West Bengal
Bengali
|}